Trusting Is Good... Shooting Is Better (also known as Dead for a Dollar and I'll Kill You, and Recommend You to God) is a 1968 Italian Spaghetti Western film written and directed by Osvaldo Civirani.

Cast 

 George Hilton: Glenn Reno 
 John Ireland: The Colonel
 Sandra Milo: Liz
 Piero Vida: The Portuguese
 Gordon Mitchell: Roy Fulton
 Franco Ressel: Hartmann
 Mimmo Palmara: Nick (credited as Dick Palmer)
 Andrea Scotti: Higgins

References

External links

1968 films
1960s Western (genre) comedy films
Spaghetti Western films
Films directed by Osvaldo Civirani
Films scored by Angelo Francesco Lavagnino
1968 comedy films
1960s Italian-language films
1960s Italian films